Provdám svou ženu is a 1941 Czechoslovak comedy film directed by Miroslav Cikán. It stars Vlasta Burian, Světla Svozilová, and Jaroslav Marvan.

References

External links
 Provdám svou ženu at the Internet Movie Database

1941 films
Czechoslovak comedy films
1941 comedy films
Films directed by Miroslav Cikán
Czechoslovak black-and-white films
1940s Czech films